Isabel Township may refer to one of the following places in the United States:

Isabel Township, Fulton County, Illinois
Isabel Township, Benson County, North Dakota

Township name disambiguation pages